The Artist in his Studio is an oil painting on panel by Rembrandt c. 1628. The painting shows an artist' studio in realist style. It is held by the Museum of Fine Arts in Boston, Massachusetts.

One critical analysis of the painting commented on the size disparity between the canvas inside the painting and the actual canvas, saying "Rembrandt's picture is small relative to its subject, rendering something far grander than itself–a painting several times its own size."

References

External links
Museum of Fine Arts, Boston

Paintings by Rembrandt
1620s paintings
Paintings in the collection of the Museum of Fine Arts, Boston
Paintings about painting